Shinas (شناص in Arabic), population 43,312 as of 2005, is a coastal town in northern Oman, near  the border between Oman and United Arab Emirates.
Shinas has a distinctive collection of traditional buildings. The port of Shinas has dhows that are still operated and generate profits from fishing and exporting fresh seafood to the neighbouring Dubai for restaurant use.

The town has a mountainous terrain, like much of Oman.

Gallery

See also
 List of cities in Oman

References
Shinas College

External links

 Omani web site

Populated places in Oman
Al Batinah North Governorate